Gunmen is a 1988 Hong Kong action crime drama film produced by Tsui Hark, directed by Kirk Wong and starring Tony Leung, Adam Cheng and Waise Lee.  The film was released in Hong Kong theatrically before Hong Kong motion picture rating system took effort; afterwards, the film was rated Category III for the home video release.

Plot
During the Chinese Civil War, a group of war friends Ting Kwan-pik, Cheung, Lau Fuk-kwong and Cheung Cho-fan were captured and brutally tortured by officer Haye. After they escape, Ting headed to Shanghai and became a cop. Ting is also one of the few righteous, incorruptible cops in Shanghai. Although the police force consists mostly of corrupt cops, the superintendent is an honest man. One time during a drug raid, Ting kills Haye's uncle, Leung. Haye, who has now became an opium smuggler, vows of revenge and later kills Ting's partner. Ting also swears revenge, and with nobody else helping, he tracks down his war friends and enlists their help to outlaw opium smuggling.

Cast
Tony Leung Ka-fai as Ting Kwan-pik
Adam Cheng as Haye
Waise Lee as Captain Cheung
Mark Cheng as Lau Fuk-kwong
David Wu as Cheung Cho-fan
Elvis Tsui as Superintendent
Carrie Ng as Cho Chiu
Elizabeth Lee as Mona Fong Siu-man
Andrew Kam as Uncle Leung
Ho Leng-leng as Sze-sze
Yuen Bun as Captain Keung
Wong Kam-kong as Tsou
Chui Po-lun as Ting Kwan-pik's subordinate
Cho King-man
Wong Hung as Fatty
Stewart Tam as Station Inspector
Chu Tau as Brother San
Kam Piu as interpreter for France Ambassador
Jackson Ng as Haye's thug
Chiu Kwok-chi as corrupt cop
James Ha as opium maker
Lau Fong-sai as Cheung
Law Kam-fai
Nip Wang-fung
Ng Kwok-kin as cop
Shing Fu-on as Haye's soldier
Lui Tou-cheung
Choi Man-hung
Lung Ying as Hung's thug
Ho Wing-cheung as Haye's thug
Kong Long as opium maker
Tin Kai-man as Haye's thug
Yeung Sing as Haye's thug
Lam Tit-ching as Haye's thug
Ho Chi-moon as Superintendent's assistant
Hui Sze-man as prostitute
James M. Crockett as French ambassador

Box office
The film grossed HK$4,825,777 at the Hong Kong box office during its theatrical run from 22 October to 7 November 1988 in Hong Kong.

External links

Gunmen at Hong Kong Cinemagic

Gunmen film review at LoveHKFilm.com

1988 films
1988 action thriller films
1988 crime drama films
Hong Kong action thriller films
Hong Kong crime films
Hong Kong drama films
Triad films
Police detective films
1980s Cantonese-language films
Films set in the 1930s
Films set in Shanghai
Films about the illegal drug trade
1980s Hong Kong films